Midway Dragway is an eighth mile drag racing facility located in Greeleyville, South Carolina. It is sanctioned by the International Hotrod Association.

In 2007, the track underwent a change of ownership and was renamed Midway Dragway from Midway Dragstrip.

Built in 2001, the dragstrip was named for its location, approximately midway between Charleston, SC, and Florence, SC.

External links
Midway Dragway Website
International Hot Rod Association Website

Drag racing venues
Motorsport venues in South Carolina
Buildings and structures in Williamsburg County, South Carolina
Tourist attractions in Williamsburg County, South Carolina